Lazar Fedorovich Bicherakhov (15 November 1882 – 22 June 1952) was a Russian army officer who participated in World War I and the Russian Civil War, as a member of the Imperial Russian and White Russian armies respectively.

Biography 
Bicherakhov hailed from a Cossack family of Ossetian descent. He graduated from the real school in St. Petersburg and Alekseevsky military school in Moscow.

He served in the 1st Gorsko-Mozdok regiment of the Terek Cossack Host (1911–1914) of the 1st Caucasus Cossack Division, which had its headquarters in the town of Oltu, Kars Oblast. In 1912, L. Bicherakhov had the rank of sotnik.

During World War I, Bicherakhov served in 1915–1918 in the expeditionary corps of General Nikolai Baratov in Persia as the commander of the Terek Cossack detachment with the rank of army starshina. He was awarded the Order of St. Vladimir of the 4th degree.

In June 1918, Bicherakhov made an alliance in Enzeli with British General Lionel Dunsterville to take joint action against Ottoman and Soviet forces in the Caucasus.

Since Dunsterville had no troops available for immediate deployment to prevent the advance of the Ottoman army, it was agreed to allow Bicherakhov to temporarily cooperate with the Bolsheviks. On 1 July 1918, by agreement with the leaders of the Baku Commune Bicherakhov arrived with a unit of 600 Cossacks to Baku to fight against the Islamic Army of the Caucasus under the command of Turkish general Nuri Pasha Killigil and the armed forces of Azerbaijan Democratic Republic in the battle of Baku. However, battlefield failures forced Bicherakov to withdraw with his men to Petrovsk-Port. In October 1918, Bicherakhov declared allegiance to the Provisional All-Russian Government, and was conferred the rank of major-general in the white army.

Bicherakhov emigrated in 1919 to Great Britain, and from there to Germany in 1928, where during World War II he led North Caucasus people's section in the pro-Nazi Committee for the Liberation of the Peoples of Russia. He died and was buried in Ulm in 1952.

References 

1882 births
1952 deaths
Military personnel from Saint Petersburg
Russian military personnel of World War I
White movement generals
White Russian emigrants
Russian Liberation Army personnel